Dufourcq or Duffourcq is a family name which may refer to

 Charles-Emmanuel Dufourcq (1914–1982):  French medievalist historian
 Élisabeth Dufourcq (1940–): French politician and writer
 Jacques Duffourcq (1881–1975): French rugby player
 Jean Dufourcq: French Counter admiral
 Nicolas Dufourcq (1963–): French businessman
 Norbert Dufourcq (1904–1990): French organist, musicologist and musicographer